Bruno Sutter may refer to:
 Bruno Sutter (footballer)
 Bruno Sutter (singer)
Bruno Sutter (album)